Events from the year 1969 in Pakistan.

Incumbents

Federal government
President: Ayub Khan (until 25 March), Yahya Khan (starting 25 March)
Chief Justice: Hamoodur Rahman

Events
1969 – General Ayub Khan resigns and General Yahya Khan takes over.

Births
March 6 – Tahir Zaman, field hockey player and coach.

See also
 1968 in Pakistan
 1970 in Pakistan
 List of Pakistani films of 1969
 Timeline of Pakistani history

References

External links
 Timeline: Pakistan - BBC

 
1969 in Asia